Zavier Marquis Simpson (born February 11, 1997) is an American professional basketball player for the Lakeland Magic of the NBA G League. He played college basketball for the Michigan Wolverines and played in the National Basketball Association for the Oklahoma City Thunder.

Simpson attended Lima Senior High School where he won the 2016 Ohio Mr. Basketball as a senior. Simpson won 2014 Ohio Division III state championship as a sophomore for Lima Central Catholic High School before transferring to Lima Senior High School the following school year. He was part of the 2017–18 team that reached the Championship Game of the 2018 NCAA Division I men's basketball tournament. Simpson was a member of 2017 and 2018 Big Ten Conference men's basketball tournament champions during his first two seasons. He had many of his best games against top-10 opponents as a sophomore. As a junior, he was a 2019 Second team All-Big Ten selection and a Big Ten All-Defensive team honoree and earned the nickname "Captain Hook" for his unusual skill at shooting hook shots. As a senior, he was a 2020 Second team All-Big Ten selection. As a junior he set the current Big Ten men's basketball tournament single-tournament assists record (30) and led the Big Ten Conference in assists as a senior (7.9).

Early life and high school career
Simpson was born on February 11, 1997, in Lima, Ohio to Bobbie Carter and Quincey Simpson. He had served as a ball boy for Lima Senior High School since second grade when his father was an assistant coach for the Lima Senior team. In elementary school, Simpson spent a half hour dribbling the basketball every morning and worked out for one and a half hours doing basketball drills once he reached high school. On December 15, Simpson broke two-time Ohio Mr. Basketball Greg Simpson's Lima Senior High School single-game scoring record by posting 59 points against Fremont Ross High School. Simpson was a cousin who grew up with Zavier's father, Quincy. On February 2, Simpson posted 65 points against Fremont Ross.

Simpson played his freshman and sophomore seasons for Lima Central Catholic High School before transferring to Lima Senior when his father became head coach there before his junior season. Simpson earned the 2014 Ohio Division III state championship as a sophomore and the 2015 Ohio Associated Press Division I Player of the Year as a junior. Simpson was named 2016 Ohio Mr. Basketball by the Associated Press. Simpson's Lima Senior High School was undefeated until losing in the OHSAA Division I championship game to Westerville South High School, finishing the season 29–1. Simpson also earned the Ohio Boys Basketball Gatorade Player of the Year honor.

Recruiting
On September 9, 2015, Zavier Simpson committed to playing college basketball for Michigan. By the end of his high school career, he was ranked as the No. 49 player and No. 12 point guard by ESPN, No. 57 player and No. 12 point guard by Scout, No. 65 player and No. 19 point guard by Rivals, and No. 93 player and No. 17 point guard by 247Sports. Austin Davis, Ibi Watson, Jon Teske and Simpson all signed their National Letters of Intent on November 11, 2015. Michigan recruits Simpson, Watson and Teske were all named to the 2015–16 Associated Press Ohio High School Division I Boys Basketball All-State 1st Team. ESPN's Jeff Borzello named Simpson as one of the top 25 entering freshman in the 2016–17 class on April 6, 2016.

College career

Freshman season

As a freshman, Simpson was part of a 2016–17 Michigan Wolverines team that won the 2017 Big Ten Conference men's basketball tournament. The Wolverines reached the sweet sixteen round of the 2017 NCAA Division I men's basketball tournament. After averaging 1.6 points and 8.7 minutes as a freshman, Simpson changed the spelling of his name prior to his sophomore season from Xavier to Zavier.

Sophomore season

As a sophomore for the 2017–18 Wolverines, Simpson posted his career high 16 points in contest against top 5 rated opponents: On January 13, 2018, Michigan won their rivalry game against (#4 AP Poll/#4 Coaches Poll) Michigan State 82–72. Simpson tallied 16 points in Michigan's first road victory against a top-five ranked team since defeating (#3 AP Poll/#3 Coaches Poll) Michigan State on January 25, 2014; On January 25, 2018, Michigan lost to (#3 AP Poll/#3 Coaches Poll) Purdue 88–92 despite 16 points from Simpson. In two of his other top-5 games, Simpson had 15-point games against both (#5 AP Poll/#7 Coaches Poll) Purdue on January 9, 2018. and (#2 AP Poll/#2 Coaches Poll) Michigan State on March 3, 2018.

The March 4 victory over Purdue gave Michigan its second consecutive Big Ten tournament championship since the game was the championship game of the 2018 Big Ten Conference men's basketball tournament. Simpson averaged 12.3 points, 4.8 rebounds, 4.0 assists and 1.3 steals in 35 minutes per game for Michigan in its four-game tournament run. On March 22, Michigan defeated Texas A&M 99–72 in the regional semifinals of the 2018 NCAA tournament. Simpson posted a career-high six steals as part of a stat line that included 11 points, 5 assists and 4 rebounds. In the first four games of the tournament, Simpson posted averages of 7.3 points, 5.0 rebounds, 4.5 assists and 2.8 steals to help Michigan reach the Final Four. The team lost in the 2018 NCAA Division I Men's Basketball Championship Game to (#2 Coaches Poll/#2 AP Poll) Villanova. Since the team reached the championship games of both the Big Ten tournament and the NCAA Tournament, Simpson shares the Michigan (and NCAA) single-season games played record (41) with teammates Duncan Robinson, Muhammad-Ali Abdur-Rahkman, Teske and  Charles Matthews. Members of the 2010–11 Connecticut Huskies also played 41 games (an NCAA record).

Junior season

On November 17, 2018, Simpson posted 14 points and 11 rebounds for his first career double-double, to help Michigan defeat George Washington 84–61. On December 30, Michigan defeated Binghamton 74–52. Simpson posted a career-high 10 assists, and one rebound shy of a double-double.  On January 10, Michigan defeated Illinois 79–69. Michigan was led by Simpson with a season-high 16 points and improved to 16–0 on the season, matching the school's best start to a season. On January 13, Michigan defeated Northwestern to establish a school record for best start at 17–0 and tied the school's record 17-game win streak on the strength of a career-high 24-point effort by Simpson. On January 19, Simpson posted 10 points and 11 rebounds, for his second career double-double in a loss to Wisconsin. On January 22, Simpson was one of four Big Ten athletes named to the Naismith Defensive Player of the Year Award Top 15 midseason watchlist. On January 29 against Ohio State, Simpson posted 11 points, 10 rebounds and a career-high 12 assists, becoming the sixth player in Michigan program history to record a triple-double. The game marked Simpson's 100th career game with Michigan, becoming the 70th Wolverine to the reach the milestone. Simpson recorded his 300th career assist, becoming the 15th Wolverine to surpass the milestone. On March 3, Simpson posted 12 points and 10 assists, for his third double-double of the season in a win against (#17/#20) Maryland. Following the season, he was a 2019 Second team All-Big Ten selection (coaches and media) and a Big Ten All-Defensive Team honoree. On March 12, the U.S. Basketball Writers Association named Simpson to its 2012–13 Men's All-District V (OH, IN, IL, MI, MN, WI) Team, based upon voting from its national membership.  He was named to the  National Association of Basketball Coaches Division I All-District 7 second team on March 21, as selected and voted on by member coaches of the NABC, making him eligible for the 2019 NABC Coaches' Division I All-America team. Over the course of his junior season, he served as captain and - unusually for a guard - developed a reliable hook shot, earning the nickname "Captain Hook".

On March 15, Michigan opened its 2019 Big Ten Conference men's basketball tournament play with a 74–53 victory over Iowa in the quarterfinals. Simpson posted 10 points and 11 assists for his fourth career double-double. The next day Simpson posted 15 points and nine assists in a 76–49 victory over Minnesota, helping Michigan advance to the Big Ten tournament final for the third consecutive season. With his nine assists in the game, Simpson became the 10th Wolverine in program history to surpass 400 career assists. On March 17 in the championship game, Simpson posted six points and ten assists in a 60–65 loss to Michigan State. Simpson finished the tournament with a tournament-record 30 assists in three games, surpassing the previous record of 29 assists set by Mateen Cleaves in 1999, and was subsequently named to the All-Tournament Team. He achieved the 30 assists while only making two turnovers. On March 21, Simpson posted four points and ten assists in a 74–55 victory over Montana in the first round of the 2019 NCAA tournament. With his 10 assists in the game, Simpson set a single-season program record for the most games with 10 or more assists in a season with eight games. For the season, he led Michigan in minute played 33.9/game and led the Big Ten in Assist:Turnover ratio (3.3).

Senior season
Prior to the season Simpson was named to the 10-man preseason All-Big Ten team. He was also named to the preseason Cousy Award 20-man watchlist. The team began the season unranked but receiving votes in the national polls. On November 22, Michigan defeated Houston Baptist 111–68 as Simpson posted 22 points and 14 assists, both career-highs, for his fifth career double-double (first with 20 points). The 14 single-game assists tied a pair of 1987 games by Gary Grant for second in school history behind Derrick Walton's 15-assist game set in 2017. Michigan's 111 points were the most points scored in a game since a 112–64 victory over Indiana in 1998. On December 3, in a 43–58 loss to Louisville during the ACC–Big Ten Challenge, Simpson posted three assists in the game, becoming the fourth Wolverine in program history to surpass 500 career assists. He was named to the midseason watchlist for the Wooden Award. On January 17, with six assists in the game, Simpson moved into second place on Michigan's all-time assists list with 579. 

On January 26 at 3:03 AM, Simpson was the driver of Michigan Athletic director Warde Manuel's family vehicle when it made contact with a street sign and a utility pole, and gave a false name to the police regarding his involvement at the scene of the crash. Simpson was suspended one game for missing team curfew on January 27, causing him to miss the January 28 game against Nebraska. This was the first game he missed in his career, snapping his streak of 135 consecutive games played. He was reinstated on January 31. On February 4, in a 58–61 loss to Ohio State, Simpson posted 15 points and five assists, becoming the second player in Michigan program history to surpass 600 career assists. On February 16, in an 89–65 victory over Indiana, Simpson posted 12 points and 11 assists, for his ninth career double-double. With the win, Simpson and Teske became the winningest players in program history with 105 career victories. Simpson also set a program record for the most games with 10 or more assists (15). On February 19 in a 60–52 victory over Rutgers, Simpson posted 16 points, six rebounds, five assists and two steals. Simpson became the fourth player in program history to surpass 1,000 career points and 500 career assists, following Antoine Joubert, Gary Grant and Rumeal Robinson. Simpson was one of 10 players named a semifinalist for the Naismith Defensive Player of the Year Award, and the lone Big Ten athlete. On February 27 in a 
74–81 loss to Wisconsin, Simpson posted a career-high 32 points, six assists and five rebounds. Following the season, he was named a 2020 Second team All-Big Ten selection by both the coaches and media. Simpson led the Big Ten conference in assists (7.9) for the season.

Professional career

Oklahoma City Thunder / Blue (2021–2022)
On September 17, 2020, Simpson signed his first professional contract with Science City Jena of the German ProA, but left the team before the start of the season. On November 18, 2020, Zavier signed with the Los Angeles Lakers as an undrafted free agent but was waived in December. He landed with the Oklahoma City Blue of the NBA G League, making his debut in their season opener on February 11, 2021. In 15 games, he averaged 9.8 points, 4.3 rebounds and 6.1 assists in 28.5 minutes.

Simpson joined the Los Angeles Lakers for the 2021 NBA Summer League.

On October 15, 2021, Simpson signed with the Oklahoma City Thunder, but was waived the same day subsequently re-signing with the Blue on October 28. In 47 games, he averaged 12.7 points, 4.6 rebounds and 6.2 assists in 30.3 minutes per game. On April 5, 2022, he signed with the Thunder for the rest of the season. Simpson made his NBA debut against the Portland Trail Blazers on April 5, 2022, where he played 44 minutes and recorded 10 points, 5 assists, 3 rebounds, and 2 blocks. In his second game the next night, he tallied 11 assists against the Utah Jazz.

Lakeland Magic (2022–present)
Simpson joined the Orlando Magic for the 2022 NBA Summer League. He eventually signed with the Magic for 2022 NBA training camp in September, but he was waived by the team on October 8. On November 3, 2022, Simpson was named to the opening night roster for the Lakeland Magic. He was named to the G League's inaugural Next Up Game for the 2022–23 season.

Career statistics

NBA

|-
| style="text-align:left;"| 2021–22
| style="text-align:left;"| Oklahoma City
| 4 || 4 || 43.5 || .365 || .125 || 1.000 || 5.3 || 7.5 || 1.3 || 1.0 || 11.0
|- class="sortbottom"
| style="text-align:center;" colspan="2"| Career
| 4 || 4 || 43.5 || .365 || .125 || 1.000 || 5.3 || 7.5 || 1.3 || 1.0 || 11.0

College

|-
| style="text-align:left;"| 2016–17
| style="text-align:left;"| Michigan
| 38 || 0 || 8.7 || .372 || .263 || .710 || .6 || 1.0 || .5 || .1 || 1.6
|-
| style="text-align:left;"| 2017–18
| style="text-align:left;"| Michigan
| style="background:#cfecec;"| 41* || 29 || 26.5 || .467 || .286 || .516 || 3.2 || 3.7 || 1.3 || .0 || 7.3
|-
| style="text-align:left;"| 2018–19
| style="text-align:left;"| Michigan
| 37 || 37 || 33.8 || .434 || .308 || .667 || 5.0 || 6.6 || 1.4 || .1 || 8.8
|-
| style="text-align:left;"| 2019–20
| style="text-align:left;"| Michigan
| 30 || 30 || 33.7 || .476 || .360 || .574 || 4.5 || 7.9 || 1.0 || .1 || 12.9
|- class="sortbottom"
| style="text-align:center;" colspan="2"| Career
| 146 || 96 || 25.2 || .455 || .314 || .590 || 3.3 || 4.6 || 1.1 || .1 || 7.3

References

External links
Michigan Wolverines bio

1997 births
Living people
American men's basketball players
Basketball players from Ohio
Lakeland Magic players
Michigan Wolverines men's basketball players
Oklahoma City Blue players
Oklahoma City Thunder players
Point guards
Sportspeople from Lima, Ohio
Undrafted National Basketball Association players
United States men's national basketball team players